The 1971 Washington Star International – Doubles was an event of the 1971 Washington Star International tennis tournament and was played in Washington, D.C., United States from July 12 through July 18, 1971. Bob Hewitt and Frew McMillan were the defending doubles champions but did not compete together in this edition. Tom Okker and Marty Riessen won the doubles title, defeating Bob Carmichael and Ray Ruffels in the final, 7–6, 6–2.

Draw

Finals

Top half

Bottom half

References

External links
 ITF tournament edition details

Washington Star International Doubles
Washington Star International
Washington Star International